The 2011 Asian Junior Badminton Championships is an Asia continental junior championships to crown the best U-19 badminton players across Asia. It was the 14th tournament of the Asian Junior Badminton Championships, and held in Lucknow, India from 2 – 9 July 2011.

Tournament 
The 2011 Asian Junior Badminton Championships organized by Badminton Asia Confederation. This tournament consists of mixed team competition, which was held from  2–5 July, as well as five individual events started from 5–9 July. Players from 19 countries participated in this competition.

Venue 
Babu Banarasi Das Indoor Stadium, at U.P. Badminton Academy, Gomti Nagar, Lucknow, India.

Medalists

Medal count

References

External links 
Badminton Asia Youth Under 19 Championships 2011 at tournamentsoftware.com
Badminton Asia Youth Under 19 Team Championships 2011 at tournamentsoftware.com

Badminton Asia Junior Championships
Badminton tournaments in India
Asian Junior Badminton Championships
Asian Junior Badminton Championships
Youth sport in India
2011 in youth sport